Andrew Martyn Hughes (born 5 June 1992) is a Welsh professional footballer who plays as a defender for Preston North End.

Career

Newport County
Hughes was a part of the Cardiff City youth system, joining them at the age of 7 before being released at aged 15. Hughes then joined the Newport County Academy and made his Newport County senior debut at the age of 16 on 10 December 2008 in the Conference South league.

In the 2011–12 season Hughes played 44 games, more than any other County player that season. He also won County's Young player of the Year award.

On 12 May 2012 Hughes played for Newport County in the FA Trophy Final at Wembley Stadium which Newport lost 2–0 to York City.

In the 2012–13 season he was part of the Newport team that finished 3rd in the league, reaching the Conference National playoffs. Newport County won the playoff final versus Wrexham at Wembley Stadium 2–0 to return to the Football League after a 25-year absence with promotion to Football League Two.

Hughes made his League Cup debut in Newport's 1st round 3–1 win at Brighton on 6 August 2013 as a second-half substitute for the injured Byron Anthony. He made his Football League debut for Newport in League Two versus Northampton Town on 10 August 2013. He scored his first Football League goal in a 1–1 draw with Scunthorpe United on 31 August 2013. Hughes signed a new deal with the club on 23 October 2013 to the end of the 2014–15 season which was further extended in the summer of 2015 to the end of the 2015–16 season.

Peterborough United
Hughes was offered a new contract by Newport County at the end of the 2015–16 season but chose to move on to Peterborough United on a two-year deal.

Preston North End
On the 21 June 2018, Hughes joined Preston North End on a three year deal for an undisclosed fee.  He scored his first goal for the club in a 3-2 loss against West Bromwich Albion on 29 September 2018.

Career statistics

References

External links

 
 
 

1992 births
Living people
Footballers from Cardiff
Association football defenders
Newport County A.F.C. players
Peterborough United F.C. players
Preston North End F.C. players
English Football League players
National League (English football) players
Welsh footballers